Ferdy Mayne (or Ferdie Mayne) (born Ferdinand Philip Mayer-Horckel; 11 March 1916 – 30 January 1998) was a German-British stage and screen actor. Born in Mainz, he emigrated to the United Kingdom in the early 1930s to escape the Nazi regime. He resided in the UK for the majority of his professional career. Working almost continuously throughout a 60 year-long career, Mayne was known as a versatile character actor, often playing suave villains and aristocratic eccentrics in films like The Fearless Vampire Killers, Where Eagles Dare, Barry Lyndon, and Benefit of the Doubt.

Early life
He was born Ferdinand Philip Mayer-Horckel in Mainz, Germany. His German father was the judge of Mainz, while his half-English mother was a singing instructor.

Because his family was Jewish, a teenage Mayne was sent to Britain in 1932 to protect him from the Nazis. He stayed with his aunt, Li Osborne (1883-1968), nee Luisa Friedericka Wolf, a well-known German theatre and film portrait photographer. Just a few years previously, she fled Germany for England, married, became Li Hutchinson-Wolf, and, as a noted sculptress, used the name Lee Hutchinson. Mayne obtained British citizenship. His parents were detained briefly in Buchenwald but, due to his mother's British family connections, were able to leave Germany for Britain, where they settled permanently.

At the start of the Second World War, Mayne operated as an informant for MI5. Significant clues to his secret service work were provided by Joan Miller in her posthumously published memoir One Girl's War (1986). Mayne had served as a witness at her marriage in 1945.

Career
Mayne appeared in 230 films and television programmes. In 1967, he achieved international recognition in his role as Count von Krolock in Roman Polanski's The Fearless Vampire Killers.

In 1977, he appeared in "It Pays to Advertise", an episode of Are You Being Served?, in the role of "The Ten Pound Perfume".

Later, Mayne moved to the United States and played the semi-regular role of Albert Grand in the TV series Cagney and Lacey.

In 1983, he played the role of Ludwig Rosenthal, a wealthy Jewish merchant persecuted and dispossessed by the Nazis, in Winds of War, a television miniseries based on the eponymous novel by Herman Wouk.

Personal life
In 1955, Mayne married actress Deirdre de Payer. Their daughter Belinda Mayne is also an actress. They also adopted a daughter, Fernanda, in 1965. The couple divorced in 1972.

Illness and death 
In the 1990s, Mayne developed Parkinson's disease, from which he died on 30 January 1998 in London, aged 81.

Partial filmography

References

External links

1916 births
1998 deaths
20th-century German male actors
Neurological disease deaths in England
Deaths from Parkinson's disease
German emigrants to England
German expatriates in the United States
German male film actors
German male television actors
Jewish German male actors
Jews who immigrated to the United Kingdom to escape Nazism
MI5 personnel
Actors from Mainz
World War II spies for the United Kingdom
German people of Jewish descent
German people of English descent